Thierry Rey (born June 1, 1959) is a French judoka, world champion and  olympic champion. He won a gold medal in the extra lightweight (60 kg) division at the 1980 Summer Olympics in Moscow.  He is the father of Martin Rey-Chirac, as a result of a relation with Claude Chirac, a daughter of late president Jacques Chirac.

References

External links
 

1959 births
Living people
French male judoka
Olympic judoka of France
Judoka at the 1980 Summer Olympics
Olympic gold medalists for France
Olympic medalists in judo
World judo champions
Medalists at the 1980 Summer Olympics
20th-century French people